Dillon Hart Francis (born October 5, 1987), also known by his alter ego DJ Hanzel, is an American electronic music producer, DJ, and "social media prankster". By deejaying and collaborating, Francis helped to popularize the new moombahton genre, and in 2012 he adapted it further into moombahcore and EDM trap, giving the music a harder sound, as heard on his EP Something, Something, Awesome.. He expanded into other EDM genres with Money Sucks, Friends Rule (2014), which hit number 2 on the Billboard dance chart, then shifted gears into Latin music with 2018's Wut Wut, a Spanish-language album honored with a Latin Grammy and a Latin American Music Award. The song "Sexo", with Residente featuring iLe, rose to number 43 on the Billboard Latin Airplay chart in June 2018.

Early life 
Francis was born in Los Angeles to an American father and a Serbian-Croatian mother. Francis has stated that his father, Robert Drew Francis, is an "alternative medicines doctor." He has made a recurring Internet joke about being unable to find his father. Francis has stated that he was very sheltered growing up, claiming that he did not know any swear words until he was 15. He also claims he could not watch TV unless he watched at least two hours of Sesame Street a day.

Career

2010–2012 
Francis first rose to fame after gaining the attention of American producer Diplo and eventually collaborating on the song "Que Que", with featured Latin-pop artist Maluca. His song "Masta Blasta", originally a 130 BPM house track, was edited after inspiration from Dutch musician Munchi and eventually ended up as the moombahton track. In 2010, Francis released his Swashbuckler EP on Play Me Records. In 2012, he also released two singles "I.D.G.A.F.O.S." and "Bootleg Fireworks (Burning Up)". He has released works on multiple labels including Dim Mak Records, Mad Decent and Owsla.

In February 2012, Francis became the first moombahton artist to achieve the number-one spot atop the Beatport releases chart with the release of his extended play Something, Something, Awesome. In late 2012, he embarked on his Wet & Reckless tour across North America, as well as supporting the English electronic-music trio Nero on their Welcome Reality tour and English musician Flux Pavilion on his Standing on a Hill tour.

2013 
In 2013, he announced a headlining Wurld Turr across the US and Canada, as well as confirming that his debut album would be released in 2013 before later experiencing various delays. He was announced as one of MTV Clubland's Artists to watch in 2013, alongside acts such as Kill the Noise and Otto Knows. Francis was labeled by MTV as an "artist to watch" as of September 9, 2013. Francis performed at music festivals including Camp Bisco, Electric Daisy Carnival, Coachella, TomorrowWorld, Ultra and Electric Zoo. Francis also created the comedy production duo Meowski666 alongside Kill the Noise. In October 2013, he was announced as number 73 in the DJ Mag Top 100 poll.

2014 

In 2014, his major label debut album, Money Sucks, Friends Rule, landed on Rolling Stone's "Top Electronic Albums of 2014" list and featured collaborators such as Twista, Brendon Urie of Panic! At The Disco, Major Lazer, and more. His single "Get Low" with DJ Snake was released on February 11, 2014. On March 22, 2014, Francis announced via his official Twitter account that his debut album, titled Money Sucks, Friends Rule, would be released on October 28, 2014, on Mad Decent and Columbia Records. In August, Dillon released his second single off of the album, which was a collaboration with Sultan + Ned Shepard featuring The Chain Gang of 1974. Beginning in February 2014, Francis embarked on the Friends Rule Tour supporting his debut album. Dates for the tour were booked through January 16, 2015, in 18 different cities across the United States.

2015–2016 
On January 1, 2015, Francis revealed to Australian radio station Triple J that he was working on a sketch show pilot for MTV. Francis stated that the show was set to go into production in January 2015. On June 28, 2015, Francis announced his EP This Mixtape Is Fire, which would mark a return to his moombahton roots. The EP features collaborations from Skrillex, Calvin Harris, Chromeo, Bro Safari, and Kygo with James Hersey, along with a remix of "I Can't Take It" from his album Money Sucks, Friends Rule by Party Favor. He released the first track from the EP, "Bruk Bruk (I Need Your Lovin')" the same day. This Mixtape Is Fire peaked at number one on Billboard Top Dance/Electronic Albums chart.

In 2016, he released three new singles: "Need You" in collaboration with Nghtmre, "Candy" in collaboration with GTA and Snappy Jit, and "Anywhere" with vocals by Will Heard.

The music video of his single "Not Butter" won the Berlin Music Video Awards in 2016, while its director, Brandon Dermer, took the 2nd place for the "Best Director" category.

2017 
On April 5, 2017, Francis released another single "Say Less" in a collaboration with rapper G-Eazy. A few days after the release, Francis made it official through a live stream that he had parted ways with Columbia Records mutually and was looking forward to release music as an independent artist. He has also revealed to his fans that he will be releasing an album as an independent artist and also stated that he would return to his moombahton roots.

Francis has created different personalities or alter egos, including "Emo Preston". Francis performed as "Emo Preston" at Emo Nite in Los Angeles in 2017.

2018 
In 2018, Dillon returned to his moombahton roots with the release of the Spanish-language studio album, Wut Wut. The album went on to earn Francis a Latin American Music Award nomination and Latin Grammy nomination respectively for the song, "Sexo" with Residente and iLe. On February 21, he released the single "We The Funk" in a collaboration with Fuego. On April 13, he released the single "Sexo" in a collaboration with Residente and iLe. "Sexo" was nominated for Best Short Form Music Video at the Latin Grammys and the Latin American Music Awards for Favorite Video.

On May 9, he released the single "BaBaBa (Vete Pa'Ya)" in a collaboration with Young Ash. On July 12, he released the single "Never Let You Go" featuring De La Ghetto. In August, he remixed Martin Solveig's single "My Love". He also was one of the headliners for Hard Summer Music Festival in August 2018. On September 12, he released the single "White Boi" featuring Lao Ra. Wut Wut is Francis' second studio album, released through IDGAFOS on September 28, 2018.

He also appeared in the first season of Taskmaster US alongside Lisa Lampanelli, Freddie Highmore, Ron Funches and Kate Berlant.

Dillon Francis released a seven-episode comedy series titled Like and Subscribe in 2018, available exclusively on Funny or Die and Amazon Video. The show follows Skyy Goldwynne (Dillon Francis), Hollywood's biggest manager who locks 4 of his influencer clients in a house with a camera crew.

On December 7, 2018, Francis released "LFGD" featuring Chris Melberger as part of Astralwerks' compilation album with livestreamer Ninja, Ninjawerks Volume 1.

2019 
On January 25, 2019, he released the single "Lost My Mind" in collaboration with Alison Wonderland, and embarked on the Lost My Mind Tour in the beginning of the year throughout the United States.

In March 2019, Francis released "Change Your Mind", featuring Lovelytheband.

Francis also contributed to the soundtrack of The Lego Movie 2: The Second Part with "Catchy Song", featuring rappers T-Pain and That Girl Lay Lay. Following the first film's "Everything Is Awesome", the song principally features the repeated phrase "This song's gonna get stuck inside your head!" According to songwriter Jon Lajoie, he found "Everything Is Awesome" "extremely catchy" and wanted to outdo the song by "dialing the song up to 11".

2020 

On May 8, 2020, he performed at the Fortnite Party Royale premiere with Steve Aoki and Deadmau5.

2021 
He performed in Las Vegas, Nevada in front of thousands in the crowd at Vegas' Life Is beautiful yearly Festival

Discography 

 Money Sucks, Friends Rule (2014)
 Wut Wut (2018)
 Happy Machine (2021)

Filmography

References

External links 

 
 
 
 

1987 births
21st-century American musicians
American DJs
American people of Croatian descent
American people of Serbian descent
American house musicians
Record producers from California
Dubstep musicians
Electro house musicians
Living people
Moombahcore musicians
Musicians from Los Angeles
Reggaeton record producers
Remixers
Los Angeles County High School for the Arts alumni
20th-century American musicians
Deep house musicians
Mad Decent artists
Owsla artists
Electronic dance music DJs
Monstercat artists
Stmpd Rcrds artists